Hellen Sander (born 25 April 1954) is a Canadian former cross-country skier who competed in the 1972 Winter Olympics.

Cross-country skiing results

Olympic Games

References

1954 births
Living people
Canadian female cross-country skiers
Olympic cross-country skiers of Canada
Cross-country skiers at the 1972 Winter Olympics
20th-century Canadian women